Givira perfida is a moth in the family Cossidae. It is found in Guatemala.

The wingspan is about 29 mm. The costal margin of the forewings is pale brown with large fuscous spots edged with white. The base is brown, broken into spots by a white subbasal line and veins. 
The hindwings are white with numerous dark spots and thick striae.

References

Natural History Museum Lepidoptera generic names catalog

Moths described in 1921
Givira